Nancy Jenkins (born June 2, 1964) is a former member of the Michigan House of Representatives from the 57th district, which covers most of Lenawee County, Michigan.

Jenkins has a bachelor's degree from Evangel University and a master's degree from the University of Toledo. She worked as a title representative and then on the staff of state senator Cameron S. Brown before being elected to the state house in 2010.

References

External links 
state house biography of Jenkins
 Nan y Junk at ballotpedia

1964 births
Living people
Republican Party members of the Michigan House of Representatives
University of Toledo alumni
Evangel University alumni
Women state legislators in Michigan
21st-century American politicians
21st-century American women politicians